L. Gilmartin (full name unrecorded) was a Scottish footballer who played as a fullback for Sheffield United in their inaugural season.

Born in Scotland, Gilmartin was one of a number of Scots who travelled South to join the newly formed Yorkshire club after United had advertised for players in the Scottish press. He played regularly during his one season at Bramall Lane, making 41 appearances although the majority of these were friendly games. He also played in all of the games that made up United's first FA Cup campaign, including the record 13–0 loss to Bolton Wanderers.

With United looking to sign a better standard of player in order to compete in League football Gilmartin was released in the summer of 1890.

References

Association football fullbacks
Scottish footballers
Sheffield United F.C. players
Year of birth missing
Place of birth missing
19th-century Scottish people
Year of death missing
Place of death missing